Sander Arends and David Pel were the defending champions but chose not to defend their title.

Victor Vlad Cornea and Petros Tsitsipas won the title after defeating Martin Krumich and Andrew Paulson 6–3, 3–6, [10–8] in the final.

Seeds

Draw

References

External links
 Main draw

IBG Prague Open - Doubles